can refer to:
 Furuichi Station (Ōsaka), a station on the Kintetsu lines in Hibakino, Ōsaka Prefecture, Japan
 Furuichi Station (Hyōgo), a station on the JR West Fukuchiyama Line in Sasayama, Hyogō Prefecture, Japan
 Furuichi Station (Hiroshima), a station on the Astram Line in Hiroshima, Hiroshima Prefecture, Japan
 , a station on the JR West Kabe Line in Hiroshima, Hiroshima Prefecture, Japan
 , a JR West station in Nagato, Yamaguchi Prefecture, Japan
 , a train station on the Osaka Metro Imazatosuji Line in Asahi-ku, Osaka, Japan

See also
 Furuichi (disambiguation)